Welling Films (sometimes written as WF) is an American film production company and studio based in Houston, Texas. It was launched in mid-2006 by Houston-born choreographer and photographer Shawn Welling. They have produced five feature films, along with the web series AXI: Avengers of eXtreme Illusions, and several narrative and documentary short films.

Company history
After Welling's dance studio was beset with Houston city council suits regarding its parking situation, he decided to document the battle on film. The studio released its first film, The House of Dreams, in 2006. This film would win Welling best director honours in 2006 and 2007 from WorldFest-Houston International Film Festival.

This win and Welling's eye as a cinematographer would foster a lasting partnership with film legend Lee Majors. In the subsequent years since the company's founding, he has appeared in six projects with the studio.

Their 2009 documentary film The Messenger: 360 Days of Bolivar, chronicled the life of four men living on the Bolivar Peninsula during the year leading up to the devastation of Hurricane Ike in the Galveston Bay Area. Among other accolades, it won the Houston Press award for best local film from the Houston area and sold out an impressive nine showings at the historic River Oaks Theatre. Additionally, city councilman and radio personality Michael Berry served as a producer on the movie, after having been an important figure in Welling's legal battle. Berry's fellow associate producer, Todd Spoth, relates a story from the film's winning weekend at Worldfest," when "An older lady pulled [him] aside following the initial screening to... express her liking for the work. She turned out to be in charge of the selection committee for the Sundance Film Festival and invited [the filmmakers] out to next year's festival."

In 2011, feature film Project Aether, earned Critics Choice Awards for 'Best Feature', 'Best Actor', and 'Best Overall World Premier' by the Houston Film Critics Society, as well as a Best Local Filmmaker Award from Houston Press, which described it as "a patchwork of the sci-fi, horror and conspiracy theory genres." That year, the Houston Press quoted Worldfest president Hunter Todd as saying that the competition was so fierce that if Spielberg were to enter his Remi-winning film to the competition that year, "it might not win, because shorts have gotten so good."
Also in 2011, he began filming The Legend of DarkHorse County, a feature film starring Olivia "Chachi" Gonzales.  The film began as an episode of AXI, but upon finding out Gonzales was strong enough as an actress, Welling decided to create the project as a feature film. The film also features actor Lee Majors, of television's The Big Valley and The Six Million Dollar Man fame. Late in the filming process, Welling added on film veteran Michael Biehn, of The Terminator, Aliens, and Tombstone. Following this project, Biehn asked Welling to be his Director of Photography for his next film.

In 2011, the studio also began the web series AXI: Avengers of Xtreme Illusions, featuring the I.aM.mE Dance crew in a series of web films in the vein of The Twilight Zone, but "infused with dance and lyrical movement that have never been seen before." The series is described as "Once Upon a Time" meets "The Twilight Zone" meets insanely good hip hop—with a Tim Burton-esque quality that's just creepy enough. Also in 2011, he began filming The Legend of DarkHorse County, a feature film starring Olivia "Chachi" Gonzales.  The film began as an episode of AXI, but upon finding out Gonzales was strong enough as an actress, Welling decided to create the project as a feature film.

In 2015, Welling Films released five different short films, ranging from topics as diverse as zombie lore to canine aging. In that year, the studio also garnered twelve awards from film festivals in the United States and internationally.

In 2016, Welling Films partnered with Wolk Films to produce "Agnosia," a dramatic feature delving into the experience of aging and the triumph of the human spirit over adversity. He also made "The Blimp Trap," a dramatic short, featuring a strong differently-abled female character.

Filmography

Distribution
Welling Films productions are typically distributed through the company's monetized YouTube channel. Feature films are not released online, but have screenings at AMC Theatres and Sundance Cinemas. Select premieres have also taken place at the historic River Oaks Theatre.

Films
The studio has produced both narrative and documentary films. They have prominently used kickstarter and indiegogo to promote the adaptation of short films into features.

Web series
Welling Films' most successful project to date has been Avengers of eXtreme Illusions (AXI) series, which has garnered over 18 million views on YouTube as of February 2016. In 2014, they launched a companion web series, In the News, featuring series creator Shawn Welling and dancing stars Phillip Chbeeb and Chachi Gonzales.

Awards
2015, won WOD Industry Award Best Director of a Web Series award at the World of Dance Industry Awards
2015, won Silver Remi Award for Best Dramatic Original Short award at WorldFest Houston for AXI: "Alive"
2015, won Crystal Award Best Houston Production "If I Could Talk" 
2015, won Special Jury Award Best New Media AXI: Avengers of eXtreme Illusions
2015, won Best Short "If I Could Talk"
2015, won Platinum Award – Best Trailer – "The Mechanic"  
2015, won Gold Remi Award – Best Short – "Adamo"
2015, won Bronze Remi Award – Best Comedy – "Romantic Beyond the Yellow Brick Road"
2015, won Gold Remi Award – Dramatic Original – "The Mechanic" 
2015, won Gold Remi Award – Dramatic Adaptation – "Salvator" 
2015, won Bronze Remi Award – Dramatic Original "The Serf"
2015, won Gold Remi Award Best Short Screenplay – Spiritual/Religious/Christian "The Mechanic"
2015, Won Silver Remi Award – Dramatic Original – "Alive"
2015, Won Gold Remi Award  – Comedy -"The Slap"
2015, Won Silver Remi Award – Comedy – "Dog Day"
2014, won Best of Festival award at the Gulf Coast Film Festival for "Adamo"
2014, won Best Movie Trailer – Feature at the Gulf Coast Film Festival for "The Legend of DarkHorse County"
2014, won Best Comedy at the Gulf Coast Film Festival for "AXI: The Game"
2014, won Platinum Remi for Best Theatrical Feature Film at WorldFest-Houston for "The Legend of DarkHorse County"
2014, won Grand Remi for Best Web Series for "AXI" at WorldFest Houston
2014, won Platinum Remi for Best Web Series for "AXI" at WorldFest Houston
2014, won Silver Remi for Best Web Series for "AXI" at WorldFest Houston
2014, won Bronze Remi for Best Music Video "AXI: Amnesty" at WorldFest Houston
2014, won Gold Remi for Best Comedy Short for  "AXI: The Game" at WorldFest Houston
2014, won Silver Remi Award for Best Movie Trailer for "AXI: Web Trailer" at WorldFest Houston
2013, won Gold Remi for Best Short – Dramatic Adaptation at WorldFest Houston
2013, won Platinum Remi for Best Short: Comedy Adaptation at WorldFest Houston
2013, won Platinum Remi for Best Short: Suspense/Thriller at WorldFest Houston
2013, won Platinum Remi for Best Use of Editing at WorldFest Houston
2013, won Platinum Remi for Best Trailer at WorldFest Houston
2013, won Grand Remi for Best New Media Production / Website at WorldFest Houston
2013, won Grand Remi for Best Texas Production at WorldFest Houston
2012, won Screenplay Gold Remi Award at WorldFest-Houston for The Legend of DarkHorse County
2012, won New Media Web Series Remi Awards Grand Award at WorldFest-Houston for AXI: Avengers of Xtreme Illusions
2011, won Best World Premiere – Critics Choice' Special Jury Award at WorldFest-Houston for Project Aether 
2011, won Science Fiction Gold Award at WorldFest-Houston for Project Aether 
2009, won Best Director Gold award at WorldFest-Houston for The Messenger: 360 Days of Bolivar 
2009, won Best Documentary festival award at Gulf Coast Film & Video Festival for The Messenger: 360 Days of Bolivar
2007, won Best Director Platinum award at WorldFest-Houston  for The House of Dreams
2006, won Best Director Gold award at WorldFest-Houston for The House of Dreams

References

American film studios
Film production companies of the United States